Hans Quest (1915–1997) was a German actor and film director.

Selected filmography
Director
Wenn der Vater mit dem Sohne (1955)
The Happy Wanderer (1955)
Charley's Aunt (1956)
Wenn Poldi ins Manöver zieht (1956)
Ein Mann muß nicht immer schön sein (1956)
The Girl Without Pyjamas (1957)
Kindermädchen für Papa gesucht (1957)
The Big Chance (1957)
Die Lindenwirtin vom Donaustrand (1957)
 (1958)
Mein Schatz ist aus Tirol (1958)
Nick Knatterton’s Adventure (1959)
Twelve Girls and One Man (1959)
Bei der blonden Kathrein (1960)
The Time Has Come (1960, TV series)
 (1961)
 (1962, TV miniseries)
 (1963, TV miniseries)
 (1964, TV miniseries)
 (1968, TV miniseries)
Father Brown (1970-1972, TV series)
Manolescu – Die fast wahre Biographie eines Gauners (1972, TV film)
Actor

 The Immortal Heart (1939) - Henner
 Der dunkle Punkt (1940)
 Friedrich Schiller – The Triumph of a Genius (1940) - Student Hoven
 My Life for Ireland (1941) - Henry Beverley
 Riding for Germany (1941) - Sohn des Fuhrwerksbesitzers
 Bismarck's Dismissal (1942)
 Sophienlund (1943) - Jürgen
 Verspieltes Leben (1949) - Kadett Kurt von Ellmer
 The Blue Swords (1949) - Johann Böttger
 No Greater Love (1952)
 The Country Schoolmaster (1954) - Ludwig, Ursulas Bruder
 Sauerbruch – Das war mein Leben (1954) - Dr. Berthold
 Love is Forever (1954) - Hasske
 Ludwig II (1955) - Kapellmeister Eckert
 Beloved Enemy (1955) - Ward, Sekretär bei Gore
 Sacred Lie (1955)
 The Ambassador's Wife (1955) - Holmgreen
 Urlaub auf Ehrenwort (1955) - Gustav Jahnke
 Magic Fire (1956) - Robert Hubner
  (1956) - Dr. Listig
 The Last Ones Shall Be First (1957) - Young attorney
 The Big Chance (1957) - Eduard Brüggemann (uncredited)
 Taiga (1958) - Weinert
  (1959) - Marinetti
 Die zornigen jungen Männer (1960) - Pater
  (1965, TV Mini-Series) - Thomas Quayle
 Aunt Frieda (1965) - Rittmeister von Stuelphagel
 Onkel Filser – Allerneueste Lausbubengeschichten (1966) - Rittmeister Friedrich Wilhelm von Stülphagel
 When Ludwig Goes on Manoeuvres (1967) - Rittmeister von Stuelphagel
 Birdie (1971) - Rolf
 Hauptsache Ferien (1972) - Oberschulrat
  (1977)
 The Serpent's Egg (1977) - Dr. Silbermann
 Der Havarist (1984) - Narrator
  (1985) - Englischer Prälat
  (1986) - Ernst Moritz Arndt
 Der 13. Tag (1991) - Präsident Benes

References

External links
 

1915 births
1997 deaths
People from Herford
People from the Province of Westphalia
German male film actors
German male television actors
Mass media people from North Rhine-Westphalia
20th-century German male actors
German military personnel of World War II
Deaths from cancer in Germany